John Gordon, 13th Earl of Sutherland (1576–1615) was a Scottish landowner and courtier.

He was the son of Alexander Gordon, 12th Earl of Sutherland and Jean Gordon, daughter of George Gordon, 4th Earl of Huntly.

He spent two years in France and returned in 1600.

In August 1602 Sutherland, Hugh Mackay of Farr, Donald Macleod of Assynt and Ardvreck, and his brother Sir Robert Gordon visited Patrick Stewart, 2nd Earl of Orkney, sailing from Cromarty to Kirkwall and Birsay in the Dunkirk, a ship belonging to Earl Patrick. In 1604 Earl Patrick came to the christening of Sutherland's first son, named Patrick, at Dornoch Castle where there were pastimes and comedies.

He fell ill at Dunrobin Castle and was carried to Dornoch where he died on 11 September 1615.

Family
He married Agnes Elphinstone (d. 1617) a daughter of the Lord Treasurer, Alexander Elphinstone, 4th Lord Elphinstone in a double wedding on 5 February 1600, with her sister Jean who married Arthur, Master of Forbes. The event was celebrated over two days in Elphinstone's lodging in the Royal Mint, or "Cunyiehous", in Edinburgh's Cowgate, with James VI and Anne of Denmark as house guests. As wedding gifts, James VI gave the brides suites of gold and pearl accessories comprising, a necklace, a belt, and back and fore "garnishings" for their hair, which cost £1,333-6s-8d Scots. Their children included:
 John Gordon, 14th Earl of Sutherland
 Colonel George Gordon
 Elizabeth Gordon, who married Sir James Crichton of Frendraught at the Castle of Bog of Gight now called Gordon Castle on 25 February 1619. Their eldest son was James Crichton, 1st Viscount Frendraught.
 Anne Gordon, who married Sir Gilbert Menzies of Pitfoddels. She died in a shipwreck in 1648.

References

1576 births
1615 deaths
16th-century Scottish people
17th-century Scottish people
17th-century Scottish peers
John
John